is a Japanese voice actress born in Sapporo, Hokkaido. She is affiliated with Production Baobab.

Biography
Hioka was born in Sapporo on July 15, 1991. She wanted to become a voice actor after watching late-night anime during high school, such as The Melancholy of Haruhi Suzumiya, Macross Frontier and Eden of the East, and learning about voice-over work. After convincing her parents, she moved to Tokyo to study at a vocational school.

Works

Anime
2012
The Ambition of Oda Nobuna – Ikeda Tsuneoki

2014
Doraemon – Girl B 
Witch Craft Works – Kotetsu Katsura

2015
Valkyrie Drive: Mermaid

2016
Dimension W – Mana Ayukawa
Lostorage incited WIXOSS – Rio Oshiba
Kuma Miko: Girl Meets Bear – Machi Amayadori
Sweetness and Lightning – Classmate

2017
Armed Girl's Machiavellism – Tsukuyo Inaba
Shadow of Laffandor – Tresta
Is It Wrong to Try to Pick Up Girls in a Dungeon?: Sword Oratoria
Magical Circle Guru Guru (2017) – MogulHinako Note – Schoolgirl

2018Mitsuboshi Colors – KotohaGoblin Slayer – Inspector

2019Afterlost – SumireRe:Stage! Dream Days♪ – Amaha ShiratoriHigh School Prodigies Have It Easy Even In Another World – Shinobu SarutobiRevisions – Daisuke Dojima (child)

2020Love Live! Nijigasaki High School Idol Club – Himeno AyanokoujiA Certain Scientific Railgun T2021Suppose a Kid from the Last Dungeon Boonies Moved to a Starter Town – AlkaBottom-tier Character Tomozaki – Mika AkiyamaSuper Cub – Shii EniwaOsamake – Akane ShidaThe Vampire Dies in No Time – Hinaichi

2022Slow Loop – Koharu MinagiDelicious Party Pretty Cure – Pam-Pam

2023Onimai: I'm Now Your Sister! – Miyo MurosakiFarming Life in Another World – Lastismun

Games
2014My Princess is The CutestLAST SUMMONER2015Milihime Taisen2016Quiz RPG: The World of Mystic WizPuyoPuyo!!Quest – Yana, Sanira

2017White Cat Project – ShizuMonster Musume☆Harem2018Alice Gear Aegis – Mai NikotamaAzur Lane – Hamakaze and TanikazeOnsen Musume – Ayase Noboribetsu

2019Dragalia Lost – Yue

2020Vivid Army – LucaDisney: Twisted-Wonderland'' – Azul Ashengrotto (childhood)

References

External links
 

1991 births
21st-century Japanese actresses
Japanese voice actresses
Living people
Production Baobab voice actors
Voice actresses from Sapporo